Statherotis afonini is a moth of the family Tortricidae. It is found in Vietnam.

References

Moths described in 2009
Olethreutini
Moths of Asia
Taxa named by Józef Razowski